Blyde-Olifants Conservancy, The Conservancy consolidates a group of privately owned game farms in the central Lowveld region into an official nature reserve. Lying roughly between Hoedspruit and Phalaborwa. Through the conservancy run two incredibly different rivers - on the one hand is the river most often associated with the colour brown - the powerful Olifants River - behind which runs the Drakensberg escarpment, creating a striking backdrop, whilst on the other is the clear, sparkling Blyde River, a tributary of the Olifants River.

Wildlife 
Include: Spotted hyena, kudu, South African giraffe, African leopard, squirrel and plains zebra, whilst the rivers are well occupied with hippo and crocodiles. Lion and African bush elephant roam these plains freely and fairly regularly.

See also 
 Protected areas of South Africa

Protected areas of Limpopo
Nature conservation in South Africa